Miroslav Laholík (born 28 August 1952) is a Czech former rower. He competed in the men's double sculls event at the 1976 Summer Olympics.

References

External links
 

1952 births
Living people
Czech male rowers
Olympic rowers of Czechoslovakia
Rowers at the 1976 Summer Olympics
People from Litoměřice
Sportspeople from the Ústí nad Labem Region
World Rowing Championships medalists for the Czech Republic